Rita Akarekor (born 13 February 2001) is a Nigerian footballer who plays for Delta Queens in the Nigeria Women Premier League, and Nigeria women's national football team in the goalkeeper position. She was adjudged the best goalkeeper in the 2016 Nigeria Women Premier League, and was the only player in her position nominated as the most valuable player in the league.

Playing career

Club
During the 2017 Nigeria Women Premier League, Akarekor scored a goal in her side's two–goal win over Adamawa Queens. She explained that it has been her desire for a while to score a competitive goal in the league. In April 2017, Akarekor was in the lineup that defeated relegation threatened Saadatu Amazons, 2-1. A goal from Amazons ended her clean sheet from two previous games. In July 2017, the penultimate game before the end of the regular season, Akarekor recorded another clean sheet against Adamawa Queens at the Atiku Abubakar Stadium.

International
Akarekor featured in the 2016 Africa Women Cup of Nations winning team.

References

External links
 CAF player profile

Living people
2001 births
Nigerian women's footballers
Nigeria women's international footballers
Place of birth missing (living people)
Women's association football goalkeepers
Sportspeople from Delta State
Delta Queens F.C. players